Cylindropuntia acanthocarpa, commonly referred to as buckhorn cholla, is a cholla native to the Mojave, Sonoran, and Colorado Deserts of North America. Along with Cylindropuntia bigelovii (the "teddy bear" cholla), it is the most common cholla found in these deserts.

Varieties

There are a number of recognized varieties include:

Cylindropuntia acanthocarpa var. acanthocarpa 
Cylindropuntia acanthocarpa var. coloradensis — L.D. Benson; Colorado buckhorn cholla.
Cylindropuntia acanthocarpa var. ganderi — (C.B. Wolf) L.D. Benson
Cylindropuntia acanthocarpa var. major — Engelm. & J.M. Bigelow 
Cylindropuntia acanthocarpa var. ramosa — Peebles
Cylindropuntia acanthocarpa var. thornberi — (Thornber & Bonker) L.D. Benson; Thornber's buckhorn cholla.

Ethnobotany
 Early spring was called ko’oak macat (the painful moon) by the Tohono O’odham because of scarce food supplies. During this season, they turned to cacti for food and pit-roasted thousands of calcium-rich cholla flower buds.[1]
 Today's O’odham people still pit-roast or boil the cholla buds, which taste like asparagus tips.

References

External links
Cylindropuntia acantocarpa photo gallery at Opuntia Web
Calflora Database: Cylindropuntia acanthocarpa (buck horn cholla)

acanthocarpa
Cacti of the United States
Flora of the California desert regions
Flora of Arizona
Flora of Nevada
Flora of Utah
Natural history of the Colorado Desert
Natural history of the Mojave Desert
North American desert flora
Plants used in Native American cuisine
Flora without expected TNC conservation status